Senator Barnitz may refer to:

Charles Augustus Barnitz (1780–1850), Pennsylvania State Senate
Frank Barnitz (born 1968), Missouri State Senate